Lastivka (Swallow) or Lastochka was the only pleasure motor ship in Kharkiv, Ukraine during its contemporary history. From 1996 till 2005 it carried passengers on the rivers of Lopan and Kharkiv. On 1 April 2005 in daytime the motorship burned out in unclear circumstances.

History
MS Lastivka was built in 1975 at Moscow Shipyard, USSR. Former name of the ship — Pavlik Morozov (homeport Dnipropetrovsk). Until its move to Kharkiv the ship ploughed waters of the Dnieper.

In 1995 by efforts of O. Sazonov MS Pavlik Morozov that had been in a sad state was moved from Dnipropetrovsk to Kharkiv using special 30-meters carriage. Restoration and reconstruction works were conducted on the river of Kharkiv in the other side of Chyhyryn bridge.

References

Ships of Ukraine
1975 ships
Transport in Kharkiv